....Envy is a series of documentaries created for Virgin 1 designed to highlight growing British obsessions.

Episodes

Seasons

Season 1
The first season's episodes began airing on 1 October 2007.

The original airdates (United Kingdom) are listed here for each episode.

References

External links
 Virgin 1 Website

2007 British television series debuts
2007 British television series endings
2000s British documentary television series
Channel One (British and Irish TV channel) original programming
2000s British television miniseries
English-language television shows